Didier Dinart (born 18 January 1977) is a French retired handball player and current coach of US Ivry Handball.

During his playing days, he played for the internationally renowned BM Ciudad Real handball team in Spain (where he was partner to, among others, Luc Abalo). Before joining BM Ciudad Real, he played for Montpellier HB of which is currently one of the best French clubs.

He was a highly skilled defensive player, and is widely regarded as one of the world's best handball defensive players. This effectiveness has granted him the nickname of La Roca (The Rock) in Spain.

He is also one of the most enduring players of the national team: his first appearance on the team was on 20 December 1996 against Croatia. He won all three major titles in handball (European championship, world championship, Olympic championship).  He has represented France at four Olympic Games, including winning the gold medal at the 2008 Beijing Olympics and the 2012 London Olympics.

Honors
 World Cup : 2001, 2009, 2011
 Champions League : 2003, 2006, 2008
 French Championship : 1998, 1999, 2000, 2002, 2003
 Spanish Championship : 2004
 Spanish Supercup : 2004
 Copa Asobal :
 French Cup : 1999, 2000, 2001, 2002, 2003
 EHF Men’s Champions Trophy: 2006

References

External links

1977 births
Living people
French male handball players
Handball players at the 2000 Summer Olympics
Handball players at the 2004 Summer Olympics
Handball players at the 2008 Summer Olympics
Handball players at the 2012 Summer Olympics
Olympic gold medalists for France
Olympic handball players of France
Guadeloupean male handball players
French people of Guadeloupean descent
Liga ASOBAL players
BM Ciudad Real players
Montpellier Handball players
Olympic medalists in handball
Medalists at the 2012 Summer Olympics
Medalists at the 2008 Summer Olympics
Officers of the Ordre national du Mérite
European champions for France
Expatriate handball players
French expatriate sportspeople in Spain
People from Pointe-à-Pitre
Handball coaches of international teams